Aziz Akbarian (born 1957) is an Iranian politician.

Akbarian was born in Hashtrud near Tabriz in East Azerbaijan. He is a member of the 8th, 9th and 10th Islamic Consultative Assembly from the electorate of Karaj, Fardis, Eshtehard and Asara. Akbarian won with 148,218 votes.

Akbarian favours executions and flogging. On 22 December 2018, he said in an interview with the local Alborz Radio, "If two people are thoroughly flogged and if two people are executed ... it will be a lesson for everyone else."

References

People from East Azerbaijan Province
Living people
1957 births
Members of the 8th Islamic Consultative Assembly
Members of the 9th Islamic Consultative Assembly
Members of the 10th Islamic Consultative Assembly
Deputies of Karaj, Fardis, Eshtehard and Asara